Sangonera Atlético Club de Fútbol was a Spanish football team based in Sangonera la Verde (a neighborhood of Murcia), in the Region of Murcia. Founded in 1996, it was dissolved in 2010, and held home matches at Estadio El Mayayo, with a capacity of 2,500 seats.

History
Founded in 1996, Sangonera reached the national categories in the following year, going on to spend one full decade in the fourth division, achieving promotion in the 2007–08 season.

After finishing 12th in 2009–10, the club was forced to fold, due to an accumulated debt of €340.000 from previous seasons. Subsequently, it was transferred to Lorca and renamed Lorca Atlético CF; Benigno Sánchez was appointed the new club's coach.

Season to season

2 seasons in Segunda División B
10 seasons in Tercera División
1 season in Categorías Regionales

Notable players
  Fernando Obama
 Mickaël Gaffoor
 Grégory Sofikitis
 Copito
 Pérez García
 Magín
 Jero Miñarro
 Iñaki Bollain
 Momo Coly
 Aid Slimane

References

External links
Official website 
Futbolme team profile 

Association football clubs established in 1996
Association football clubs disestablished in 2010
Defunct football clubs in the Region of Murcia
1996 establishments in Spain
2010 disestablishments in Spain